Kuwaiti Sign Language is the deaf sign language of Kuwait. It appears to belong to the Arab sign language family (Hendriks 2008).

References

Hendriks, Bernadet, 2008. Jordanian Sign Language: aspects of grammar from a cross-linguistic perspective (dissertation)

Arab sign languages
Languages of Kuwait